The 2009 Kilkenny Senior Hurling Championship was the 115th staging of the Kilkenny Senior Hurling Championship since its establishment by the Kilkenny County Board in 1887. The championship began on 19 September 2009 and ended on 25 October 2009.

Ballyhale Shamrocks were the defending champions.

On 17 October 2009, Young Irelands were relegated from the championship following 0–19 to 0–13 defeat by Tullaroan.

On 25 October 2009, Ballyhale Shamrocks won the championship after a 1–14 to 1–11 defeat of James Stephens in the final. It was their 13th championship title overall and their fourth title in succession.

Tullaroan's Shane Hennessy was the championship's top scorer with 1-27.

Team changes

To Championship

Promoted from the Kilkenny Intermediate Hurling Championship
 Erin's Own

From Championship

Relegated to the Kilkenny Intermediate Hurling Championship
 Dicksboro

Results

First round

Relegation play-off

Quarter-finals

Semi-finals

Final

Championship statistics

Top scorers

Top scorers overall

Top scorers in a single game

References

External links
 2010 Kilkenny SHC results

Kilkenny Senior Hurling Championship
Kilkenny